Dranouter (Dutch, locally known as Nouter) is a village and a deelgemeente in the municipality of Heuvelland in West Flanders, Belgium. Dranouter was an independent municipality before the 1977 local government reforms. Since then, it has been part of the municipality of Heuvelland. The area of the deelgemeente Dranouter is 10.73 km². The Dranouter Folk Festival is organised in the village every year. The postal code is 8951.

Population

1866 census: 1,044
1970 census: 805
1976: 789
2001: 703

Geography

Dranouter is located at the French border. The nearest towns are Bailleul (to its southwest), Poperinge (to its north), Ypres (to its northeast), and Armentières (to its southeast). The predominant land use is agriculture.

Heuvelland
Populated places in West Flanders